On the Spot! is an album by the pianist Jaki Byard recorded in 1967 apart from one track from the 1965 live recordings that produced Jaki Byard Quartet Live!. It was released on the Prestige label.

Reception

Allmusic awarded the album 3 stars with the review by Scott Yanow stating, "the music serves as a perfect outlet for Jaki Byard's eclectic talents".

Track listing 
All compositions by Jaki Byard except as indicated
 "A-Toodle-Oo, Toodle-Oo" - 3:51  
 "I Fall in Love Too Easily" (Sammy Cahn, Jule Styne) - 2:31  
 "Olean Visit" - 5:58  
 "Spanish Tinge" - 6:17  
 "Alexander's Ragtime Band" (Irving Berlin) - 2:34  
 "On the Spot" - 3:22  
 "GEB Piano Roll" - 2:42  
 "Second Balcony Jump" (Billy Eckstine, Gerald Valentine) - 6:57  
 "P.C. Blues" - 2:19  
 "Snow Flakes" - 3:14  
Recorded at Van Gelder Studio in Englewood Cliffs, New Jersey, on February 16, 1967, except track 4 which was recorded live at Lennie's on the Turnpike in West Peabody, Massachusetts, on April 15, 1965.

Personnel 
Jaki Byard - piano, alto saxophone
Jimmy Owens - trumpet, flugelhorn, tambourine
Paul Chambers (tracks 1-3 & 5-10), George Tucker (track 4) - double bass
Alan Dawson (track 4), Billy Higgins (tracks 1-3 & 5-10) - drums

References 

Jaki Byard albums
1967 albums
Albums produced by Don Schlitten
Albums recorded at Van Gelder Studio
Prestige Records albums